Forry Smith (born December 1, 1952) is an American actor. He played Reese Walker on NBC's soap opera Santa Barbara. He portrayed the role from 1992 to 1993.

Smith was an 11th round selection (309th overall pick) in the 1976 NFL Draft by the Buffalo Bills out of Iowa State University as a wide receiver.

References

External links

1952 births
Living people
People from Waterloo, Iowa
Players of American football from Iowa
American football wide receivers
Iowa State Cyclones football players
American male soap opera actors
American male television actors